Apellai, was a three-day family-festival of the Northwest Greeks  similar with the Ionic Apaturia, which was dedicated to Apollo (Doric form:).

Etymology and related words
The word is derived from the Ancient Macedonian word pélla, "stone", (Heshychius) which appears in some toponyms in Greece like Pella, Pellene Robert Beekes  suggests that the word  has probably Pre-Greek origin.  The Doric word apella originally meant wall, enclosure of stones, and later assembly of people within the limits of the square . The word usually appears in plural. Robert Beekes derives the word from the verb , ("shut off from or out from") therefore apella is the "enclosed space, meeting space".

When a pubescent was received into the body of grown men, as a grown Kouros (male youth) he became  (apellax, "sharer in secret rites") and he could enter the apellai. The apellaia were the offerings made at the initiation of the young men at a meeting of a family group.

Apellaion is the offering of a part of the hair to the god, and corresponds to the Koureion of the Apaturia. Apellaios is the month of these rites, and Apellon is the "megistos kouros" (the great Kouros).

Ancient practice
There is evidence for this festival in Epidauros, Olous, Kalchedon, "Heracleia" at Siris, Tauromenion, Chaleion, Lamia, Oeta ( (Oetē)), Tolophon, Delphi and also in Ancient Macedonia. The phratry (‘brotherhood’) controlled the access to civic rights. The three-day family-festival included initiation ceremonies, not concerning the state:
 A father introduced his young child
 A father presented his son again, later, as grown youth (kouros)
 A husband presented his wife after the marriage
The corresponding names for the offerings made were paideia (child), apellaia (kouros) and gamela (marriage, Greek: γάμος gamos).

It is almost sure that the fest belonged originally to Apollo, because his name is used in the oaths only near Poseidon Phratrios and Zeus Patroοs. In Athens a common epithet of Apollo as family-god is "Apollo Patroos".

See also
Apella
Apellaia
Ancient Macedonian calendar

Νotes

Festivals of Apollo
Ancient Greek festivals by region
Lunisolar calendars